Namig Guliyev (born 13 February 1974) is an Azerbaijani chess player. He holds the title of Grandmaster, which FIDE awarded him in 2005.

Career
In 2003 Guliyev came in first at Bischwiller. In 2005, he tied for 1st–4th places with Oleg Korneev, Andrei Sokolov and Azer Mirzoev at Béthune. In 2009, Guliyev tied for 1st–3rd with Friso Nijboer and Adam Horvath at Metz. In 2010, tied for 1st–3rd with Valentin Panbukchian and Vladimir Malaniuk at Malakoff. In 2012, he won the Open of Plancoët. Guliyev tied for first place with Miguoel Admiraal, Sergey Fedorchuk, Maxime Lagarde and Jules Moussard in the Cappelle-la-Grande Open in 2019.

He played for team Azerbaijan in the Chess Olympiads of 1994, 2006 and 2016.

He has been an active Twitch streamer since 2020, streaming online chess games.

References

External links
Namig Guliyev games at 365Chess.com

1974 births
Living people
Chess grandmasters
Azerbaijani chess players
Chess Olympiad competitors
People from Beylagan District